"Going Down to Liverpool" is a song written by Kimberley Rew for his group Katrina and the Waves, although best remembered for a cover done by the Bangles.

Background
The song was first released on the band's 1982 EP Shock Horror! (with the band then simply named The Waves) and also included on their 1983 debut album Walking on Sunshine, which was only released in Canada. The version included on both releases featured Rew on lead vocals.

When the band signed with major label Capitol Records, the song was re-recorded with Katrina Leskanich on lead vocals and included on their 1985 self-titled album. Although never released as a single, it was featured as the B-side of two of the band's singles, "Plastic Man" and their breakthrough hit "Walking on Sunshine".

The Bangles version
American band the Bangles covered the song on their 1984 major label debut album All Over the Place. The song features lead vocals by Debbi Peterson and it was released as the album's second single, one of only two singles with Peterson on lead vocals, the other being "Be with You". The song had been introduced by a friend to Vicki Peterson, who immediately liked it and urged the band to record a cover.

The single failed to chart in the U.S., and became a minor UK hit in April 1985, peaking at No. 79. The single's B-side was the album track "Dover Beach", and the 12" single featured three songs from their Bangles EP on the B-side.

When the band found success with their subsequent album Different Light, "Going Down to Liverpool" was re-released as a single in the UK and Ireland in 1986 after the release of "If She Knew What She Wants", with new cover artwork and featuring the Different Light album track "Let It Go". This time the single fared better but still only became a minor hit, peaking at No. 56, while it became a top 40 hit in Ireland peaking at No. 21.

Music video
The music video for the song was directed by Tamar Simon Hoffs, the mother of Bangles member Susanna Hoffs. The video features the band inside a car being driven around by a chauffeur, who appears to be unimpressed by the group (at one point he turns off the car radio, stopping the song). The car stops inside a tunnel and the girls walk towards the end of it, which cuts to the band playing and dancing over a red background. After the girls leave the car, the chauffeur ends up tapping his fingers on the steering wheel. Leonard Nimoy played the part of the chauffeur; this came about due to Nimoy being a friend of Tamar and Susanna's family. The video entered rotation on MTV in mid-October 1984.

Charts

References

1982 songs
1984 singles
1986 singles
Katrina and the Waves songs
The Bangles songs
Columbia Records singles
Songs written by Kimberley Rew
Song recordings produced by David Kahne
Songs about Liverpool